Pierre Chenal (5 December 1904 – 23 December 1990) was a French director and screenwriter who flourished in the 1930s. He was married to Czech-born French film actress Florence Marly from 1937 to 1955.

Work
Chenal was best known for film noir thrillers such as the 1937 film L'Alibi, where he worked with Erich von Stroheim and Louis Jouvet. In 1939 he made Le Dernier Tournant, the first of many film treatments of James M. Cain's celebrated novel, The Postman Always Rings Twice.

Chenal was Jewish and was forced in 1942 to flee occupied France with his wife, Czech actress Florence Marly, for South America. He made a number of films while living in Argentina and more in France after the war; but his post-war work never achieved the success and popularity of his pre-war efforts.

Filmography

 1970 : Les belles au bois dormantes (as Dave Young) 
 1963 : The Murderer Knows the Score
 1960 :  The Night They Killed Rasputin 
 1959 : Beast at Bay 
 1958 : Dangerous Games 
 1957 :  
 1956 : Section des disparus 
 1954 : Confession at Dawn 
 1952 : El ídolo 
 1951 : Native Son 
 1948 : Scandals of Clochemerle 
 1946 : Devil and the Angel 
 1946 : Viaje sin regreso 
 1945 : Se abre el abismo 
 1944 : The Corpse Breaks a Date 
 1943 : Todo un hombre 
 1939 : Le Dernier Tournant
 1938 : The Lafarge Case 
 1937 : The Man from Nowhere
 1937 : The Alibi 
 1937 : The Former Mattia Pascal
 1936 : Les mutinés de l'Elseneur 
 1935 : Crime and Punishment
 1934 : Street Without a Name 
 1933 : Fat Man's Worries

Bibliography
 Chenal, Pierre, Souvenirs du cinéaste, filmographie, temoignages, documents (Collection 24 souvenirs/seconde), [Autobiography, French Edition, Paperback], Dujarric, en collaboration avec les Amis de Ciné-sous-Bois, Aulnay-sous-Bois, 1987, 
 Chenal, Pierre, La dernière tempête (L'Aventure vécue), [French Edition, Paperback], Flammarion, Paris, 1975,

References

External links
 Pierre Chenal at the TCM Movie Database

French film directors
20th-century French Jews
French male screenwriters
20th-century French screenwriters
1904 births
1990 deaths
20th-century French male writers